"Bongo Rock" is a rock and roll instrumental written and recorded by Preston Epps. Released as a single in 1959, it charted #14 Pop in the United States and #4 in Canada. In 1973 the Incredible Bongo Band recorded a cover version of "Bongo Rock" under the title "Bongo Rock '73" which became a minor hit. The Incredible Bongo Band version of the tune gained significant popularity in early hip hop circles as a breakbeat. Pioneering DJ Kool Herc used it frequently in his sets. It was issued in the Ultimate Breaks and Beats compilation series and has been extensively sampled by pop and hip hop producers.

The song reached #20 on Canadian charts, partly because the producers registered it as Canadian content with MAPL certification. This is despite the fact that the recording had been made in Los Angeles by an entirely American line-up of musicians (Ed Greene, Wilton Felder, Joe Sample, David T. Walker, Bobbye Hall, and Dean Parks). The song's MAPL certification helped push it up the charts in Canada.

The Surfaris' 1963 hit single "Wipe Out" was based on this song.

References

Preston Epps songs
Songs written by Preston Epps
Incredible Bongo Band songs
1959 singles
1973 singles
1950s instrumentals
1959 songs